George Keith "Fritz" Kiersch (born July 23, 1951, in Alpine, Texas) is an American film director, writer and producer. He is perhaps best known for directing the horror film Children of the Corn and the drama Tuff Turf.<ref>On July 9, 2021, Fritz Kiersch appeared on 'The Ghost of Hollywood discussing his work on those films.</ref>

On July 9, 2021, Fritz was a special guest on the season one finale of The Ghost of Hollywood podcast. During the interview, he discussed his work on Children of the Corn and Tuff Turf.  He also talked about his production company, Kirby/Kiersch Film Group, which he founded with Terrence Kirby in 1981.

Filmography

 Director 
 1984 Children of the Corn 1985 Tuff Turf 1987 Winners Take All 1987 Gor 1989 Under the Boardwalk 1990 Fatal Charm (video) (as Alan Smithee)
 1990 Swamp Thing (TV series)
 1992 Into the Sun 1994 Shattered Image (TV movie)
 1995 The Stranger 1997 Crayola Kids Adventures: Tales of Gulliver's Travels (video)
 2006 Surveillance 2006 The Hunt''

References

External links
 

1951 births
Living people
People from Alpine, Texas
Film producers from Texas
American male screenwriters
Film directors from Texas
Screenwriters from Texas